Eugène Flachat (16 April 1802 – 16 June 1873 ) was a French civil engineer. 

Eugène Flachat and his half-brother Stéphane Mony built the railway line from Paris to Saint Germain(fr) between 1833 and 1835. They also built the Paris-Versailles Right Bank railway.
Eugène Flachat built the first railroad station in Paris. He is remembered today for redesigning the Gare Saint-Lazare railway station in Paris in 1851 and other railroad related projects.  He died in Arcachon. A street in Paris is named for him. His name is one of the 72 names inscribed on the Eiffel Tower.

References

External links 
 Rue Flachat, Paris

Engineers from Paris
1802 births
1873 deaths
Burials at Montmartre Cemetery
French railway civil engineers
French railway pioneers